Marius Clarén (born December 21, 1978), also Marius Götze-Clarén is a German Voice Actor, dialogue writer, dialogue director and Radio Play Voice Actor.

Biography 
Marius Clarén already took over as child his first voice acting jobs.
His father had an Acting training, initially worked as a voice actor and then as culture editor at RIAS and the SFB. Likewise, his older brother Timo Clarén stood behind the microphone several times during his childhood.

His first appearance he had in Terminator 2: Judgment Day where he voiced John Connor played by Edward Furlong. His brother, Timo Götze-Clarén, also worked as a voice actor as a child, but later chose a different career In the original - radio play to Sam Raimi's Spider-Man film (in whose German dubbed version Clarén lent his voice to the main character) Clarén also acts as the narrator. – . He has also read audio books - for example Töte deinen Boss (en.:Kill your boss) (with Nana Spier) and Artemis (with Gabrielle Pietermann)

His son Cosmo Clarén also works as a voice actor. Both had a joint appearance on The Boss Baby, in which Marius voiced the older version of the role of Cosmo. His second son Vicco Clarén and his third son Carlo Clarén are also voice actors.

Texts (dubbed books)

Selected voice roles 
Chris Klein 1999: American Pie ... Oz
 1999: Election ... Paul Metzler
 2001: Say It Isn't So ... Gilbert Noble
 2001: American Pie 2 ... Oz
 2006: American Dreamz ... William Williams
 2018: The Flash ... Orlin Dwyer / Cicada

Jake Gyllenhaal

James D'Arcy
 2004: Exorcist: The Beginning ... Pater Francis
 2005: An American Haunting ... Richard Powell
 2007: Rise: Blood Hunter ... Bishop
 2016: Gernika ... Henry
 2017: Dunkirk ... Captain Winnant
 2017: The Snowman ... Filip Becker

Joshua Jackson
 1994: D2: The Mighty Ducks ... Charlie Conway
 1996: D3: The Mighty Ducks ... Charlie Conway
 2000: The Skulls  ... Lucas "Luke" McNamara

Shawn Hatosy
 1999: Witness Protection ... Sean Batton
 2011: Street Kings 2: Motor City ... Det. Dan Sullivan

Tobey Maguire

 Movies 

 Series 

 Video games 
 2002: Aquanox 2: Revelation – "Stoney Fox"
 2003: Star Wars Jedi Knight: Jedi Academy – "Rosh Penin"
 2004: Spider-Man 2 – The Game ... Peter Parker/Spider-Man
 2007: Spider-Man 3 – The Game ... Peter Parker/Spider-Man
 2009: Simon the Sorcerer: Who'd Even Want Contact ... Captain Narrow
 2011: Skylanders: Spyro's Adventure ... Spyro the Dragon
 2012: Diablo 3 ... Wizard (male)
 2012: Skylanders: Giants ... Spyro the Dragon
 2014: Dragon Age: Inquisition – Cole
 2017: Railway Empire – Cornelius Vanderbilt

 Audio books 
 Jodi Picoult: Das Herz ihrer Tochter (en. title: Change of Heart) (together with Jens Wawrczeck, Anna Thalbach, Tanja Geke and Felicia Wittmann), Der Hörverlag, 
 Andy Weir: Artemis (together with Gabrielle Pietermann), Random House Audio, 
 Chris Rylander: Die Legende von Greg 1: Der krass katastrophale Anfang der ganzen Sache, (en. title: The Legend of Greg (An Epic Series of Failures)) Silberfisch, 
 Anke Stelling: Freddie und die Bändigung des Bösen (en.: Freddie and the Taming of Evil), cbj audio (Random House Audio), 

Percy Jackson
 Percy Jackson 1 – Diebe im Olymp (Percy Jackson & the Olympians)
 Percy Jackson 2 – Im Bann des Zyklopen (Percy Jackson & the Olympians: The Sea of Monsters)
 Percy Jackson 3 – Fluch des Titanen (Percy Jackson & The Olympians: The Titan's Curse)
 Percy Jackson 4 – Schlacht um das Labyrinth (Percy Jackson & The Olympians: The Battle of the Labyrinth)
 Percy Jackson 5 – Die letzte Göttin (Percy Jackson & the Olympians: The Last Olympian)
 Percy Jackson erzählt: Griechische Göttersagen (Percy Jackson's Greek Gods)
 Percy Jackson erzählt: Griechische Heldensagen (Percy Jackson's Greek Heroes)
Helden des Olymp
 Helden des Olymp 1 – Der verschwundene Halbgott (The Heroes of Olympus: The Lost Hero)
 Helden des Olymp 2 – Der Sohn des Neptun (The Heroes of Olympus: The Son of Neptune)
 Helden des Olymp 3 – Das Zeichen der Athene (The Heroes of Olympus: The Mark of Athena)
 Helden des Olymp 4 – Das Haus des Hades (The Heroes of Olympus: The House of Hades)
 Helden des Olymp 5 – Das Blut des Olymp (The Heroes of Olympus: The Blood of Olympus)
Goblins
 Goblins 1 – Die Goblins (Goblin Quest)
 Goblins 2 – Die Rückkehr der Goblins (Goblin Hero)
 Goblins 3 – Der Krieg der Goblins (Goblin War)
 Goblins 4 – Der Goblin-Held (Goblin Tales)
Die Schattenwald-Geheimnisse
 Die Schattenwald-Geheimnisse 1 – Wald der tausend Augen (Sophie and the Shadow Woods: The Goblin King)
 Die Schattenwald-Geheimnisse 2 – Der Vergessene Ort (Sophie and the Shadow Woods: The Swamp Boggles)
 Die Schattenwald-Geheimnisse 3 – Gefährliche Verwandlung (Sophie and the Shadow Woods: The Spider Gnomes)
 Die Schattenwald-Geheimnisse 4 – Die Nebelkönigin (Sophie and the Shadow Woods: The Fog Boggarts)

Bibi & Tina
 Bibi & Tina 68 – Die Urlaubsüberraschung (en. translation: Bibi and Tina 68 - The Holiday Surprise)
 Bibi & Tina 79 – Rennpferd in Not (en. translation: Bibi and Tina 79 - Racehorse in Distress'')

tschick

External links

References 

1978 births
German voice directors
German male voice actors
Living people